The Qader is a medium-range anti-ship cruise missile developed by Iran.

Development 
The missile called "Qader" (Able) is an upgraded version of Noor (a copy of Chinese C-802 missile). The missile, which was unveiled in August 2011, has a range of 300 km and is described by Iranian officials as "the most powerful and precise missile of the Islamic Republic of Iran’s Navy".

On 10 February 2013, the head of Iran Aviation Industries Organization announced that an air-launched version of Qader and Nasr-1 will be tested in a week.

Features and capabilities 
 Anti-ship cruise missile with a range of over 200 km
 A 200-kilogram warhead
 Anti-ship cruise missile flying at low altitude and deals with the enemy with low radar cross section
 Digital autopilot system
 High-precision navigation system
 The possibility of planning to shoot missiles
 Advanced radar and ability to deal with electronic warfare 
 Quick preparation and reaction missile to attack coastal targets in addition to the target vessel
 The ability to launch from land, sea and air
Management systems: active radar can fly at a height of 3 to 5 meters

See also
Military of Iran
Iranian military industry
Current Equipment of the Iranian Army

References

Anti-ship missiles of Iran
Anti-ship cruise missiles of Iran
Military equipment introduced in the 2010s